Lincoln Township is one of ten townships in Andrew County, Missouri, United States. As of the 2010 census, its population was 1,184.

Lincoln Township was named after John Lincoln, a member of the Lincoln family who settled the area.

Geography
It contains three cemeteries: Greenwick, Hackberry, and Old Union.

The streams of Caples Creek, Hopkins Creek, Mill Creek, and the Nodaway River run through this township.

References

 USGS Geographic Names Information System (GNIS)

External links
 US-Counties.com
 City-Data.com

Townships in Andrew County, Missouri
Townships in Missouri